Zumunta AC is a Nigerien football club based in Niamey. Their home games are played at the Stade Général Seyni Kountché.

Achievements
Niger Premier League: 3
1985, 1988, 1993

Niger Cup: 1
1994

Performance in CAF competitions
African Cup of Champions Clubs: 1 appearance
1994 – First Round

CAF Cup: 2 appearances
1992 – First Round
1993 – Quarter-Finals

CAF Cup Winners' Cup: 2 appearances
1978 – Preliminary Round
1995 – First Round

Current squad

Football clubs in Niger
Super Ligue (Niger) clubs
Sport in Niamey